NGC 6760 is a globular cluster  in the constellation Aquila. It may have contributed to the formation of the open cluster Ruprecht 127 during NGC 6760's passage through the galactic disk 71 million years ago.

At least two millisecond pulsars have been found in NGC 6760.

References

External links
 
 
 Simbad
 NGC 6760

Globular clusters
Aquila (constellation)
6760